Strathmoor is a former suburb of Louisville, Kentucky. It has since splintered into the cities of:

 Kingsley, Kentucky
 Strathmoor Manor, Kentucky
 Strathmoor Village, Kentucky